Book of Dreams is the tenth studio album by Steve Miller Band. The album was released in May 1977 on Capitol Records in the United States, Canada and Japan and by Mercury Records in Europe. Three singles were released from the album in 1977 with the first single, "Jet Airliner", being the most successful.

The album peaked in the top 10 of the trade charts in four countries, including Canada where the album topped RPM magazine's 100 Albums chart. The album has gone on to become one of the group's most successful studio albums.

Recording and production
The songs on Book of Dreams were recorded at CBS Studios in San Francisco, California; the basic tracks were recorded at the same time as the basic tracks for Fly Like an Eagle. The sessions were produced by the group's leader, Steve Miller, who had been producing the group's albums since Number 5 in 1970. John Palladino was the album's executive producer and the recording engineer was Mike Fusaro. The recordings were later mixed by Jim Gains with assistance from Win Kutz and were mastered by Ken Perry.

Artwork
The winged horse art was created by Alton Kelley and Stanley Mouse, who were credited as "Kelly and Mouse". The art director for the album was Roy Kohara. The cover illustration was also used on the record label on the vinyl version of the album.

Reception

AllMusic gave the album a rating of 4/5 stars, calling it "a highlight of the '70s classic rock era and one of Miller's finest releases." The review also comments that it is an unnecessary album for the casual fan to consider, as the compilation album Greatest Hits 1974–78 contains seven highlight tracks from Book of Dreams.

Track listing

Personnel
 Steve Miller – vocals, guitar, synthesizer, sitar, producer
 David Denny – guitar
 Greg Douglass – guitar, slide guitar
 Byron Allred – piano, synthesizer
 Lonnie Turner – bass guitar
 Gary Mallaber – drums, percussion

Additional personnel
 Norton Buffalo – harmonica on "Winter Time" and "The Stake"
 Les Dudek – lead guitar on "Sacrifice"
 Kenny Johnson – drums on "Sacrifice"
 Jachym Young – piano on "Sacrifice"
 Charles Calamise – bass guitar on "Sacrifice"
 Curley Cooke – acoustic guitar on "Sacrifice"
 Bob Glaub – bass guitar on "Winter Time"

Technical
 John Palladino – executive producer
 Mike Fusaro – recording engineer
 Jim Gains – mixing
 Win Kutz – assistant mixer
 Ken Perry – mastering
 Roy Kohara – art direction
 Kelly – illustration
 Mouse – illustration

Charts

Weekly charts

Year-end charts

Certifications and sales

References

1977 albums
Steve Miller Band albums
Capitol Records albums